Thomas Bscher (born 2 April 1952) is an automobile race car driver and banker.

External links
Driver DB Profile

German racing drivers
24 Hours of Le Mans drivers
American Le Mans Series drivers
1952 births
Living people
Sportspeople from Marburg
West Competition drivers
David Price Racing drivers